Leionema ellipticum is a shrub species that is endemic to  Queensland in Australia. It is a small shrub with smooth green leaves and creamy-white flowers in spring.

Description
Flowering occurs from December to January.

Taxonomy and naming
Leionema ellipticum was first formally described by Paul G. Wilson in 1998 and the description was published in the Nuytsia.  The specific epithet (ellipticum) is derived from the Latin elipticus referring to the shape of the leaves.

Distribution and habitat
This species has a restricted distribution found growing at a windy, mountainous location in north-east Queensland.

References

ellipticum
Sapindales of Australia
Flora of Queensland
Taxa named by Paul G. Wilson